"Who Feels Love?" is a song by the English rock band Oasis, written by the band's lead guitarist Noel Gallagher. It became the second single to be released from the album Standing on the Shoulder of Giants, peaking at number four on the UK Singles Chart and entering the top 20 in Ireland, Italy, and Spain.

The album was noted for its psychedelic feel, and "Who Feels Love?" was held up as the most extreme example of this. Mark Stent was praised for his production on the song, creating a "trippy" feel like that found on Beatles songs such as "Rain". With the psychedelic and Eastern sound, the song also reminds of George Harrison achievements like "Within You Without You" and also some of his solo work. However, despite the acclaimed production, the song itself was not well received by the critics, with NME stating that the production "triumphs over any real sort of feeling... pure mock Maharishi spirituality that not even Liam can salvage from the realm of self-parody".

One of the B-sides is a cover of The Beatles' "Helter Skelter". It was played live during the SOTSOG tour of 2000.  Paul Weller recorded a version of B-side "One Way Road" for his covers-album Studio 150 in 2004. The Weller version was subsequently used as the theme tune to Jack Dee's sitcom Lead Balloon.

The video was shot in Death Valley, California in December 1999.

Personnel
Oasis
Liam Gallagher – lead vocals, tambourine
Noel Gallagher – electric guitars, acoustic guitars, backing vocals
Alan White – drums, percussion

Additional musicians
Paul Stacey – keyboards, Minimoog, bass, backwards guitar

Track listing
CD RKIDSCD 003

All songs written by Noel Gallagher except track 3

"Who Feels Love?" – 5:45
"One Way Road" – 4:03
"Helter Skelter" – 5:51 (Lennon–McCartney)

7" RKID 003
"Who Feels Love?" – 5:45
"One Way Road" – 4:03

12" RKID 003T
"Who Feels Love?" – 5:45
"One Way Road" – 4:03
"Helter Skelter" – 5:51

Cassette RKIDCS 003
"Who Feels Love?" – 5:45
"One Way Road" – 4:03

 The UK CD also contains the promo video to "Who Feels Love?"
 "Helter Skelter" was recorded during the sessions for Be Here Now and it is produced by Owen Morris.
Japanese CD edition ESCA 8133
"Who Feels Love?" – 5:44
"One Way Road" – 4:03
"Gas Panic!" (demo) – 6:39

 The demo for "Gas Panic!" was only ever officially released in Japan before being included on a free Oasis CD issued with The Sunday Times on 23 June 2002.
 Musician, Rob Smith said in an interview on Irish national television in December 2006 that this was the most under-rated song of all time and should be "praised for its genius".

Charts

References

2000 singles
Oasis (band) songs
Songs written by Noel Gallagher
Song recordings produced by Noel Gallagher
1999 songs
UK Independent Singles Chart number-one singles